The Worldloppet Ski Federation is an international federation of long distance cross-country skiing events whose aim is to promote cross-country skiing through ski races. The federation was founded on 10 June 1978 in Uppsala, Sweden.

Locations
Only one and the best race from a country can be a member of Worldloppet. There are (written 2015) 20 races, spread amongst Europe, America, Asia and Australia:

Racing distances 

Actual racing distances may vary from year to year according to the local snow conditions, but usually, there are different categories: full distance (at least 42 km, the length of a non-skiing marathon (26 miles)) and shorter ones for children and less experienced skiers. Some races are freestyle (both skating and classic are allowed), but others only permit classic style.

Worldloppet Master

Those who complete Worldloppet races in 10 different countries, at least one of which is from a continent other than Europe, qualify as a Worldloppet Master. They qualify for Worldloppet Gold Master if they have completed 10 main races, or a Silver Master if they have competed 10 races where some or all of them are short races. As of October 2019 more than 5000 master titles have been issued.

References

External links
Worldloppet website
International Association of Worldloppet Skiers
Gatineau Loppet

Cross-country skiing
Skiing organizations
1978 establishments in Sweden
Sports organizations established in 1978
International sports organizations
International organisations based in Italy